44 Boötis or i Boötis is a triple star system in the constellation Boötes.  It is approximately 41.6 light years from Earth.

44 Boötis can be resolved into two stars, of 5th and 6th magnitudes respectively.  They were separated by  when the pair were confirmed in 1819, but were only  by 2020 as the two orbit every 210 years.

The primary component, 44 Boötis A, is a yellow-white G-type main sequence dwarf with a mean apparent magnitude of +4.83. The companion component, 44 Boötis B, is a W Ursae Majoris variable spectroscopic binary. The variability of this star system was discovered by English astronomer William Herschel. The brightness of the eclipsing binary varies from magnitude +5.8 to +6.40 with a period of 6.43 hours. The two eclipsing components of the are close enough to allow their stellar envelopes to overlap, or at least nearly so.

It also may show signs of an infrared excess, implying the existence of a dust disk that absorbs visible light and re-emits it as infrared light. The dust would have a blackbody temperature of about 23 K, situated up to 182 au from the parent star.

References

External links
 HR 5618
 Image 44 Boötis
 CCDM J15038+4739

Boötes
Bootis, i
Bootis, 44
133640
087379
Spectroscopic binaries
Triple star systems
W Ursae Majoris variables
G-type main-sequence stars
Bootis, 44
5618
0575
BD+48 2259
K-type main-sequence stars